Martin Millar (born 1959) is a Scottish writer.

Martin Millar may also refer to:

 Martin Millar (Doctors)
 Martin Millar (sport shooter), see 2002 Commonwealth Games results

See also
 Martin Miller (disambiguation)